Kahani Hum Sab Ki is a 1973 Bollywood drama film directed by Rajkumar Kohli. The film stars Lalita Pawar and Mala Sinha.

Cast
Mala Sinha
Vinod Mehra
Om Prakash
Roopesh Kumar   
Lalita Pawar

Songs
"Bach Ke Kaha Jaoge Kiche Huye Chale Aaoge" - Lata Mangeshkar

External links
 

1973 films
1970s Hindi-language films
1973 drama films
Films scored by Laxmikant–Pyarelal